The Burlington Area School District (BASD) is a school district in the U.S. state of Wisconsin that serves Burlington and the surrounding area. 

The district has eight schools:

BASD is also a member of the Southern Lakes Alternative High School Consortium, allowing students in tenth through twelfth grade attend the Southern Lakes Corsortium Alternative High School.  The school is also open to students from four other area school districts.

References

External links 
Burlington Area School District Homepage

Education in Racine County, Wisconsin
School districts in Wisconsin